The Defense Support Program (DSP) is a program of the United States Space Force that operated the reconnaissance satellites which form the principal component of the Satellite Early Warning System used by the United States.

DSP satellites, which are operated by the 460th Space Wing, detect missile or spacecraft launches and nuclear explosions using sensors that detect the infrared emissions from these intense sources of heat. During Desert Storm, for example, DSP was able to detect the launches of Iraqi Scud missiles and provide timely warnings to civilians and military forces in Israel and Saudi Arabia.

The satellites are in geosynchronous orbits, and are equipped with infrared sensors operating through a wide-angle Schmidt camera. The entire satellite spins so that the linear sensor array in the focal plane scans over the Earth six times every minute.

Typically, DSP satellites were launched on Titan IVB boosters with Inertial Upper Stages. However, one DSP satellite (DSP-16) was launched using the Space Shuttle Atlantis on mission STS-44 (24 November 1991).

The last known DSP satellite (flight 23) was launched in 2007 aboard the first operational flight of the Delta IV Heavy rocket, as the Titan IV had been retired in 2005. All 23 satellites were built by the prime contractor Northrop Grumman Aerospace Systems, formerly TRW, in Redondo Beach, California.

The 460th Space Wing, with headquarters at Buckley Space Force Base, Colorado, has units, primarily the 2nd Space Warning Squadron, that operate DSP satellites and report warning information, via communications links, to the NORAD and USSTRATCOM early warning centers within the Cheyenne Mountain Space Force Station, Colorado. These centers immediately forward data to various agencies and areas of operations around the world.

The SBIRS Wing at the Space Systems Command, Los Angeles Space Force Base, California is responsible for development and acquisition of the satellites.

History 
The Defense Support Program replaced the 1960s space-based infrared Missile Defense Alarm System (MIDAS). The first successful launch of MIDAS (MIDAS-2) was 24 May 1960 and there were twelve launches before the DSP program replaced it in 1970.

The first launch of a DSP (IMEWS-1 - Integrated Missile Early Warning Satellite) was on 6 November 1970 and since then it has become the mainstay of the United States ballistic missile early warning system. For the last 45 years they have provided an uninterrupted space-based early warning capability. The original DSP satellite weighed 2,000 pounds (900 kg) and had 400 watts of power, 2000 detectors and a design life of 1.25 years.

Throughout the life of the program, the satellite design has undergone numerous improvements to enhance reliability and capability. The weight grew to 5,250 pounds (2380 kg), the power to 1275 watts, the number of detectors increased threefold to 6000 and the design life has been increased to a goal of ten years.

The numerous improvement projects have enabled DSP to provide accurate, reliable data in the face of evolving missile threats. On-station sensor reliability has provided uninterrupted service well past their design lifetime. Recent technological improvements in sensor design include above-the-horizon capability and improved resolution. Increased on-board signal-processing capability improves clutter rejection. Enhanced reliability and survivability improvements were also incorporated.

The 23rd, and last DSP satellite (DSP-23) was scheduled to be launched on 1 April 2007, aboard a Delta IV Heavy rocket, but the launch was postponed until mid-August 2007 after two structural cracks were found in the metal launch table at pad 37B, caused by a fuel leak during testing. Further delays forced the launch back to 11 November 2007, when the satellite launched at 01:50:00 UTC (20:50 EST on 10 November). This satellite died in space sometime during 2008, for reasons unknown. It is now adrift in geosynchronous orbit and remains a potential hazard to other craft.

The Department of Defense sent a MiTEx spacecraft to inspect DSP 23 sometime in 2008.

Another DSP satellite was lost in 1999, DSP-19, after its Inertial Upper Stage failed following launch from a Titan 4B booster. DSP-19 was a USAF Defense Support Program missile early warning satellite equipped with an infrared telescope to detect rocket launches. The Titan 4B rocket placed the IUS upper stages and payload into a 188 km x 718 km x 28.6° parking orbit. The first stage on the IUS burned at 18:14 GMT and put the second stage and payload into a geosynchronous transfer orbit. The IUS second stage fired at 23:34 GMT. However, the two stages of the IUS failed to separate completely. At least one connector remained attached. This meant the second stage motor nozzle did not extend properly. When the stage fired, the vehicle tumbled during the burn and the satellite was left out of control in a useless orbit.

The project was originally to have had 25 satellites, but the last two have been canceled, mainly due to SBIRS. DSP satellites have been replaced by the Space-Based Infrared System (SBIRS) satellites.

There were five major improvement programs on the 23 satellites:

 Block 1: Phase I, 1970–1975, five satellites
 Block 2: Phase II, 1976–1987, seven satellites
 Block 3: Multi-Orbit Satellite Performance Improvement Modification (MOS/PIM), 1989–1991, three satellites
 Block 4: Phase II Upgrade, 1994–1997, two satellites
 Block 5: DSP-I (DSP-Improved), 1999–2007, six satellites

More recently, there has been some effort put into using DSPs' infrared sensors as part of an early warning system for natural disasters like volcanic eruptions and forest fires.

Limitations 
The DSP constellation may have offered an excellent vantage point for an early warning system against state-centric threats such as missiles, but military analysts warn its ability to collect intelligence on non-state actors is severely limited.

General characteristics 
 Primary mission: strategic and tactical missile launch detection
 Contractor team: Northrop Grumman Aerospace Systems, formerly TRW (for satellite bus) and Northrop Grumman Electronic Systems, formerly Aerojet Electronics Systems (for IR sensor)
 Weight: 5,250 lb (2,380 kg)
 Orbit altitude: 22,000 miles (35,900 km)
 Power plant: solar arrays generate 1485 watts
 Height: 32.8 ft (10 m) on orbit; 28 ft (8.5 m) at launch
 Diameter: 22 ft (6.7 m) on orbit; 13.7 ft (4.2 m) at launch
 Date first deployed: 1970
 Date late deployed: 2007
 Latest Satellite Block: satellites 18–23
 Unit Cost: US$400 million

Gallery

See also 

 Missile Defense Alarm System (MIDAS)
 Space Based Infrared System (SBIRS)

References

External links 
 US Air Force DSP Satellites Fact Sheet
 Augmented-reality view of DSP satellites 
 Orbit of DSP F22, the latest operational DSP satellite

Military satellites
Missile defense
Reconnaissance satellites of the United States
Equipment of the United States Space Force
Early warning systems
Military space program of the United States
Infrared technology
Early warning satellites
Spacecraft launched by Delta IV rockets
Military equipment introduced in the 1970s